Mermithida is an order of nematode worms. The order includes two families, and most members are endoparasites on arthropods. One of the morphological characteristic of the order is the presence of a stichosome.

References 

Enoplea
Parasitic nematodes of animals
Nematode orders